London 3 North West is a level 8 league within the RFU league structure and is made up of teams predominantly from north-west London and Hertfordshire.  Promoted sides tend to move up to London 2 North West while relegated teams drop to Herts/Middlesex 1.  Each year all clubs in the division also take part in the RFU Senior Vase - a level 8 national competition.

Teams for 2021–22

The teams competing in 2021-22 achieved their places in the league based on performances in 2019-20, the 'previous season' column in the table below refers to that season not 2020-21.

Old Merchant Taylors', who finished 9th in 2019-20, withdrew from the league in November 2021, consequently it will be completed with eleven teams.

Season 2020–21

On 30 October the RFU announced  that a decision had been taken to cancel Adult Competitive Leagues (National League 1 and below) for the 2020/21 season meaning London 3 North West was not contested.

Participating Clubs 2019–20

Participating Clubs 2018–19

Participating Clubs 2017–18

Participating Cubs 2016-17
Cheshunt (promoted from Herts/Middlesex 1)
Datchworth
Finchley
Grasshoppers
Hackney
Hemel Hempstead 
Hitchin
Kilburn Cosmos (promoted from Herts/Middlesex 1)
Old Merchant Taylors' (relegated from London 2 North West)
St Albans 
Staines (relegated from London 2 North West)
Stevenage Town

Final league table

Participating Clubs 2015-16
Belsize Park
Datchworth
Finchley
Grasshoppers
Hackney
Hemel Hempstead (relegated from London 2 North West)
Hitchin
London Nigerian (promoted from Herts/Middlesex 1)
Old Actonians (promoted from Herts/Middlesex 1)
St Albans (relegated from London 2 North West)
Stevenage Town
Wasps

Participating Clubs 2014-15
Belsize Park (promoted from Herts/Middlesex 1)
Datchworth
Finchley
Fullerians
Grasshoppers
Hackney (promoted from Herts/Middlesex 1)
Hitchin
Old Streetonians
Stevenage Town
UCS Old Boys (relegated from London 2 North West)
Wasps
Welwyn

Participating Clubs 2013-14
Datchworth 	
Finchley
Fullerians (relegated from London 2 North West)
Grasshoppers (relegated from London 2 North West)
Harrow (promoted from Herts/Middlesex 1)
Hitchin
London New Zealand
Old Merchant Taylors' (promoted from Herts/Middlesex 1)
Old Streetonians (relegated from London 2 North East)
Stevenage Town (relegated from London 2 North East)
Wasps
Welwyn

Participating Clubs 2012-13
Barnet Elizabethans
Cheshunt
Datchworth	
Finchley
Haringey Rhinos
Hitchin
Imperial Medicals
London New Zealand
Old Priorians
Twickenham	
Wasps
Welwyn

Participating Clubs 2009-10
Bank of England
Barnet Elizabethans
Cheshunt
Datchworth
Fullerians
Haringey Rhinos
Hitchin
Old Ashmoleans
Old Hamptonians
Old Streetonians
West London

Original teams

When this division was introduced in 2000 (as London 4 North West) it contained the following teams:

Bank Of England - promoted from Herts/Middlesex 1 (champions)
Chiswick - relegated from London 3 North West (9th)
Fullerians - relegated from London 3 North West (7th) 
Grasshoppers - relegated from London 3 North West (6th) 
Hampstead - relegated from London 3 North West (12th) 
Hemel Hempstead - relegated from London 3 North West (8th) 
Letchworth Garden City - relegated from London 3 North West (10th) 
London New Zealand - promoted from Herts/Middlesex 1 (runners up)
Old Millhillians - relegated from London 3 North West (13th)
St Albans - relegated from London 3 North West (14th) 
Tring - relegated from London 3 North West (15th)

London 3 North West honours

London 4 North West (2000–2009)

Originally known as London 4 North West, this division was a tier 8 league with promotion up to London 3 North West and relegation down to Herts/Middlesex 1.

London 3 North West (2009–present)

League restructuring by the RFU ahead of the 2009–10 season saw London 4 North East renamed as London 3 North West.  Remaining as a tier 8 league promotion was to London 2 North West (formerly London 3 North West), while relegation continued to Herts/Middlesex 1.

Number of league titles

Old Streetonians (2)
Chiswick (1)
Civil Service (1)
Finchley (1)
Fullerians (1)
Grasshoppers (1)
Hackney (1)
Hammersmith & Fulham (1)
Harrow (1)
H.A.C. (1)
Letchworth Garden City (1)
London New Zealand (1)
London Nigerian (1)
London Scottish (1)
London Welsh (1)
Old Haberdashers (1)
Old Priorians (1)
Tring (1)
Welwyn (1)

Notes

See also
Hertfordshire RFU
Middlesex RFU
English rugby union system
Rugby union in England

References

8
4